Mbumburu is a suburb of Honiara, Solomon Islands and is located West of the main center and South of Rove. It is renowned for a small garden of replica Henry Moore sculptures, established in 2009 by local benefactor Roger Mbumbe.

References

Populated places in Guadalcanal Province
Suburbs of Honiara